Antonio del Carmen Monestel Zamora (1868–1937) was the first bishop of the Roman Catholic Diocese of Alajuela.

Monestel was a native of San Jose, Costa Rica.  Monestel studied in Rome, and was ordained a priest in 1891.  He served in various parishes as a parish priest, before serving in administrative positions with the Diocese of San Jose and then becoming Bishop of Alajuela.

Sources
article on Diocese of Alajuela

1868 births
1937 deaths
People from San José, Costa Rica
20th-century Roman Catholic bishops in Costa Rica
Roman Catholic bishops of Alajuela